Ranakdevi is a 1946 Indian Gujarati historical drama film written and directed and produced by V. M. Vyas. The film was based on the legend of Ranakadevi.

Plot
Siddhraj Jaysinh is a Solanki ruler of Patan. He was a childless and decided to conduct a worship of Shiva with his queens. Ranak is a daughter of Parmara of the Sindh and an adopted daughter of Hadmat Kumbhar of Majevadi village near Junagadh. Shrikanth Barot, his bard, arranges a mock marriage of Ranak with a sword of Jaysinh as he predict she will be a mother of his child. Before the mock marriage, Junagadh king Khengar abducts Ranak to avenge his father Navghan. Jaysinh attacks Junagadh and won the battle with aid of Deshal and Vishal, nephews of Khengar. He returns to Patan with Ranak but on their way, at Wadhwan on the banks of river Bhogavo, she commits sati by burning herself on the funeral pyre.

Cast
The following actors were starred in the film:
 Anjana
 Motibai
 Dulari
 Nirupa Roy
 Lilavati
 Lila Jayawant
 Mallika
 Damayanti
 Chandrabala
 Amubai
 Sumati
 Daksha
 Kavita
 Bhagwandas
 Pande
 Chhanalal Thakur
 Natwarlal Chohan
 Master Dhulia
 Shyam
 Gangaram
 Gautam

Production
The film is based on local folk legend of Ranakadevi, a 12th century queen of Khengara, the Chudasama ruler of Saurashtra region of western India. In film, the historical events were mixed with folk legends. The film was directed and produced by V. M. Vyas. The story was written by Mohanlal G. Dave while the script was written by V. M. Vyas. The dialogues were written by Karsandas Manek. Nirupa Roy made her debut as an actress in the film.

Soundtrack

Release and reception
The film was released in 1946. It was the only Gujarati film released that year. It was well received by the audience.

References

External links 
 

1946 films
Films set in Gujarat
Films shot in Mumbai
Films shot in Gujarat
Films based on Indian folklore
1940s Gujarati-language films
Indian historical drama films